This page lists Japan-related articles with romanized titles beginning with the letter C. For names of people, please list by surname (i.e., "Tarō Yamada" should be listed under "Y", not "T"). Please also ignore particles (e.g. "a", "an", "the") when listing articles (i.e., "A City with No People" should be listed under "City").

C
C-HTML

Ca
Cabinet of Japan
Calpis
Canon (company)
Capcom
Capital of Japan
Capsule hotel
Captain Tsubasa
Cardcaptor Sakura
Casio
Castle in the Sky
The Castle of Cagliostro
Castle town
Castlevania
Catgirl

Ce
Celestial Legend Ceres
Cell (dragonball)
Cell Games
Central Japan Railway Company
Central League
Central Research Institute of Electric Power Industry

Ch
Champloose
Chansey
Chapatsu
Characters of Naruto
Char Aznable
Chara
Charter Oath
Chatan, Okinawa
Chen Kenichi
Chi-Chi
Chiba, Chiba
Mamoru Chiba
Chiba Prefecture
Chiben Gakuen
ChibiChibi
Chibiusa
Chibu, Shimane
Chichibu, Saitama
Chigasaki, Kanagawa
Takako Chigusa
Chihayaakasaka, Osaka
Chikamatsu Monzaemon
Chikugo Province
Chikugo River
Chikugo, Fukuoka
Chikuho, Fukuoka
Chikujō District, Fukuoka
Chikuma, Nagano
Chikusa, Hyogo
Chikusa-ku, Nagoya
Chikushi District, Fukuoka
Chikushino, Fukuoka
Chikuzen Province
Children's Day
Chimata-No-Kami
Chimecho
China, Kagoshima
Chindōgu
Chinen, Okinawa
Chino, Nagano
Chinpara
Chinzei, Saga
Chiryu, Aichi
Chita, Aichi
Chita District, Aichi
Chitose, Hokkaidō
Chitose, Ōita
Chiyoda, Hiroshima
Chiyoda, Saga
Chiyoda, Tokyo
Chiyonofuji Mitsugu
Chizu Express
Chizu, Tottori
Cho Tsunatatsu
Chobits
Chobits characters
Chobits Media Information
Chocobo
Chofu Airport
Chōfu, Tokyo
Chopsticks
Choshi, Chiba
Choyo, Kumamoto
Chrono Break
Chrono Cross
Chrono Cross Plot
Chrono Trigger
Chrysanthemum
Chrysanthemum Throne
Chūbu Centrair International Airport
Chūbu region
ChuChu Rocket!
Chūgoku region
Chuka, Okayama
Chun-Li
Chunan, Kagawa
Chunichi Dragons
Chunichi Shimbun
Chūō Line
Chūō Main Line
Chūō Shinkansen
Chūō-ku (disambiguation)
Chūō-ku, Chiba
Chūō-ku, Fukuoka
Chūō-ku, Kobe
Chūō-ku, Osaka
Chūō-ku, Sapporo
Chūō, Tokyo
Chūō, Kumamoto

Ci
Cinema of Japan
Circuit (country subdivision)
Cities of Japan
City designated by government ordinance (Japan)
City Hunter
A City with No People

Cj
CJK

Cl
Clamp (manga artists)
Cloistered rule

Co
Code Geass
Comfort women
Combined Fleet
Comet Hyakutake
Comet Ikeya-Seki
Comic book
Comic Party
Coming of age
Commodore Smoker
Communications in Japan
Computer Go
Conqueror (Band-Maid album)
Constitution of Japan
Convention of Kanagawa
Conveyor belt sushi
Copy protection in Japan
Core city
Corsola
Cosplay
County
Cowboy Bebop
Cowboy Bebop: The Movie
Cowboy Bebop Media Information

Cr
Crayon Shin-chan
Cream Lemon
Crest of the Stars
Crime in Japan
Criminal Code of Japan
Crotch rope
Crystalis

Cu
Cuisine of Japan
Culture of Japan

Cy
Cyrillization of Japanese

C